In college football, 2007 NCAA football bowl games may refer to:

2006–07 NCAA football bowl games, for games played in January 2007 as part of the 2006 season.
2007–08 NCAA football bowl games, for games played in December 2007 as part of the 2007 season.